Butler is an unincorporated community and census-designated place (CDP) in Delaware County, Oklahoma, United States. The population was 117 at the 2010 census.

Geography
Butler is located in northeastern Delaware County on the south side of Honey Creek where it enters the Grand Lake o' the Cherokees.

Demographics

References

Census-designated places in Delaware County, Oklahoma
Census-designated places in Oklahoma